Attorney General Saeed may refer to:

Fathimath Dhiyana Saeed (born 1974), Attorney General of the Maldives
Hassan Saeed (fl. 2000s), Attorney General of the Maldives

See also
Ali Said (Indonesia) (1927–1996), Attorney General of Indonesia